
This is a list of the 32 players who earned their 2008 European Tour card through Q School in 2007.

 2008 European Tour rookie

2008 Results

* European Tour rookie in 2008
T = Tied 
 The player retained his European Tour card for 2009 (finished inside the top 118).
 The player did not retain his European Tour Tour card for 2009, but retained conditional status (finished between 119-151).
 The player did not retain his European Tour card for 2009 (finished outside the top 151).

Winners on the European Tour in 2008

Runners-up on the European Tour in 2008

See also
2007 Challenge Tour graduates
2008 European Tour

References
Final Results
Player biographies and records

European Tour
European Tour Qualifying School Graduates